The Assistant Secretary of Defense for Networks & Information Integration (ASD(NII)) was an appointed position that provided management and oversight of all DoD information technology, including national security systems. The ASD(NII) also served as the chief information officer (CIO) of the United States Department of Defense (DoD), a position distinct from the ASD and governed by the Clinger-Cohen Act.

The ASD(NII)/DoD CIO was the principal staff assistant and advisor to the Secretary of Defense and Deputy Secretary of Defense on networks and network-centric policies and concepts; command, control and communications (C3); non-intelligence space matters; enterprise-wide integration of DoD information matters; Information Technology (IT), including National Security Systems (NSS); information resources management (IRM); spectrum management; network operations; information systems; information assurance (IA); positioning, navigation, and timing (PNT) policy, including airspace and military-air-traffic control activities; sensitive information integration; contingency support and migration planning; and related matters.

The ASD(NII)/DoD CIO had responsibilities for integrating information and related activities and services across the Department of Defense. The ASD(NII)/DoD CIO also served as the DoD Enterprise-level strategist and business adviser from the information, IT, and IRM perspective; Information and IT architect for the DoD enterprise; and, DoD-wide IT and IRM executive.

The Director, Defense Information Systems Agency (DISA), reported to the ASD(NII)/DoD CIO.

In August 2010, Secretary of Defense Robert Gates announced that the position of ASD(NII) would be eliminated. On January 11, 2012, the position of ASD(NII) was disestablished. Most of the position's responsibilities were retained by the DoD CIO.

History 

This office was previously known as the Assistant Secretary of Defense (Command, Control, Communications and Intelligence), or ASD(C3I), and was redesignated ASD(NII) in May 2003.

ASD(C3I) traces its origins back to the Assistant to the Secretary of Defense (Telecommunications), an advisory position established in May 1970. A single person held this position before it was replaced in January 1972 by the Assistant Secretary of Defense (Telecommunications), an office with more weight in the Pentagon bureaucracy. The post was eliminated in January 1974, with responsibilities transferred to the Director, Telecommunications and Command and Control Systems under Defense Directive 5135.1.

In March 1977, a new post, the Assistant Secretary of Defense (Command, Control, Communications and Intelligence), was established by Defense Directive 5137.1, replacing both the Director, Telecommunications and Command and Control Systems and the Assistant Secretary of Defense (Intelligence)/Director of Defense Intelligence. (The ASD(I) had been established in November 1971, with some functions transferred from the Assistant Secretary of Defense (Administration). From July 1976 to March 1977, the ASD(I) held the additional designation of Director of Defense Intelligence.)

Starting in October 1977, the ASD(C3I) also served as Principal Deputy Under Secretary of Defense for Research and Engineering. In March 1981, the office was retitled Deputy Undersecretary of Defense for Communications, Command, Control, and Intelligence, a position with more bureaucratic weight than that of an assistant secretary. However, the Department of Defense Authorization Act of 1984 (P.L. 98-94), passed in September 1983, mandated the existence of an ASD(C3I). Thus, this post reverted to the title assistant secretary of defense in April 1985 (following Defense Directive 5137.1). The ASD(C3I) was the principal staff officer to Secretary of Defense in his role as executive for the National Communications System. The ASD(C3I) also had responsibilities to oversee the activities of DISA, the Defense Intelligence Agency, and the Defense Security Service. Following Pentagon reorganizations in 2003, the portfolio of ASD(C3I) was transferred to the ASD(NII), the Under Secretary of Defense for Intelligence, the Director of the Defense Intelligence Agency and elsewhere.

Elimination 

On May 17, 2010, Secretary of Defense Robert M. Gates directed an independent panel of corporate executives (known as the Defense Business Board) to make recommendations on options to materially reduce DoD overhead and increase efficiency in internal business operations. On July 22, the Defense Business Board offered a series of proposals on how the Pentagon could cut $100 billion from its budget over the next five years. According to Arnold Punaro, the group's chair and retired executive at SAIC, "The task group is identifying many of the tough choices that must be made, not only because it is good business management, but today's fiscal environment and future warfighting requirements will not tolerate these inefficiencies." In his remarks, Punaro recommended downsizing the Combatant Commands and all OSD organizations, "particularly the elimination of Networks and Information Integration."

On August 9, Secretary Gates announced at a press conference that DoD will be eliminating the office of the ASD(NII), and DISA will assume its information technology operational responsibilities. According to Gates, " The Office of the Assistant Secretary of Defense for Networks and Information Integration or NII was set up in 2003 when policy, oversight and advocacy functions for command, control and communications split off from intelligence. The resulting arrangement for dealing with enterprise IT and hardware issues, which includes a similar function for the J-6 on the Joint Staff, has since become redundant, costly and cumbersome."

At the same time, Gates also announced that DoD would be standing up a "refashioned and strengthened" CIO, a position whose existence is mandated in the Clinger-Cohen Act. Because the position no longer includes the permanent assistant secretary title, Senate confirmation is no longer required.

On January 11, 2012, the position of ASD(NII) was disestablished.

Past Assistant Secretaries 

The table below includes both the various titles of this post over time, as well as all the holders of those offices.

See also 
 Clinger-Cohen Act
 Command and Control Research Program (CCRP), within the Office of the ASD(NII)
 Defense Information Systems Agency
 Federal Enterprise Architecture
 Global Information Grid
 Joint Task Force-Global Network Operations
 NetOps
 Network-centric warfare

References

External links
ASD(NII)/DoD CIO website
DoD IA Policy Chart - Build and Operate a Trusted GIG

 
Network management
Science and technology in the United States